The Hardy/Webber family is a fictional middle class family on the soap opera General Hospital.

Family members
Characters currently on the show are noted in bold; family members through marriage are in italics. Only current spouses or those married at the time of their death appear here.

First generation
 Dr. Steven "Steve" Hardy - Original General Hospital character. Father of Jeff Webber. 
 Audrey March - Wife of Steve Hardy and mother of Tom Hardy.
 Lars Webber - Father of Rick Webber and Terri Webber. 
 Helene Webber - Mother of Rick, Jeff and Terri Webber.

Second generation
Terri Webber Arnett - Daughter of Lars and Helene.
 David Arnett 
 Dr. Richard "Rick" Webber Sr. - Son of Lars and Helene.
 Dr. Lesley Williams 
 Dr. Jeffrey "Jeff" Webber - Son of Steve and Helene, raised by Lars Webber. 
Carolyn Webber
 Dr. Thomas "Tom" Steven Hardy Sr. - Son of Audrey and Tom Baldwin, adopted by Steve Hardy.

Third generation
 Laura Webber Collins - Daughter of Lesley and Gordon Gray, adopted by Rick Webber. 
Kevin Collins
 Michael "Mike" Webber - Son of Rick and Lesley through adoption. Biological son of Derek Barrington and Ginny Blake.
 Richard "Rick" Webber, Jr. - Son of Rick and Ginny. 
 Dr. Thomas "Tommy" Steven Hardy Jr. - Son of Tom and Simone Ravelle.
 Dr. Steven "Steve" Lars Webber - Son of Jeff and Heather Grant. 
 Dr. Sarah Webber - Daughter of Jeff and Carolyn. 
 Elizabeth Webber - Daughter of Jeff and Carolyn.
Franco Baldwin
 Hayden Barnes (born Rachel Berlin) - Daughter of Jeff and Naomi Dreyfus.

Fourth generation
Nikolas Cassadine - Son of Laura and Stavros Cassadine. 
Ava Jerome
Lucas Lorenzo "Lucky" Spencer Jr. - Son of Laura and Luke Spencer.
Lesley Lu "Lulu" Spencer - Daughter of Laura and Luke. 
Cameron Webber - Son of Elizabeth and Zander Smith ,raised by Lucky.
Jacob "Jake" Spencer - Son of Elizabeth and Jason Morgan, raised by Lucky.
Aiden Spencer - Son of Elizabeth and Lucky.
 Violet Finn - Daughter of Hayden and Hamilton Finn.

Fifth generation
Spencer Cassadine - Son of Nikolas and Courtney Matthews.
 Aiden Spencer - Son of Lucky and Elizabeth.
 Rocco Falconeri - Son of Lulu and Dante.
 Charlotte Cassadine - Daughter of Lulu and Valentin Cassadine.

Family tree
Legend

Hardy

 Steve Hardy (died 1996); married Audrey March (1965–69, 1976–77, 1977–96)
 Jeff Webber (1950–); married Monica Quartermaine (1976–77), Heather Grant (1978–81), Carolyn Webber (1981–)
 Steven Webber (1972–); Jeff and Heather's son.
 Sarah Webber (1980–); Jeff and Carolyn's daughter.
 Elizabeth Webber (1981–); Jeff and Carolyn's daughter; married Ric Lansing (2003–04), Lucky Spencer (2005–07), Franco Baldwin (2019–21)
 Cameron Webber (2003–); Elizabeth's son with Zander Smith
 Jake Webber (2007–); Elizabeth's son with Jason Morgan.
 Aiden Spencer (2010–); Elizabeth and Lucky's son.
 Hayden Barnes (1982–); Jeff's daughter with Naomi Dreyfus; married Nikolas Cassadine (2016)
 Violet Finn (2016-); Hayden's daughter with Hamilton Finn.
 Tom Hardy (1965–); Audrey's son with Tom Baldwin, adopted by Steve; married Simone Ravelle (1988–95)
 Tommy Hardy (1987–); Tom and Simone's son.

Webber

 

 

 

 

 

 Lars Webber (deceased); married Helene Webber (deceased)
 Terri Webber; married David Arnett (deceased)
 Rick Webber (died 2002); married Lesley Williams (1977–80, 1981–2002), Ginny Blake (1984–96)
 Laura Webber (1955–); Lesley's daughter with Gordon Gray, adopted by Rick; married Scott Baldwin (1979–81, 2013–14), Stavros Cassadine (inv.), Luke Spencer (1981–2001), Kevin Collins (2017–)
 Nikolas Cassadine (1977–); Laura and Stavros' son; married Lydia Karenin (2003), Emily Quartermaine (2004–05), Hayden Barnes (2016–19), Ava Jerome (2020–)
 Spencer Cassadine (2005–); Nikolas' son with Courtney Matthews
 Lucky Spencer (1979–); Laura and Luke's son; married Elizabeth Webber (2005–07, 2007), Siobhan McKenna (2011)
 Cameron Webber (2004–); Elizabeth's son with Zander Smith,
 Jake Webber (2007–); Elizabeth's son with Jason Morgan; raised by Lucky
 Aiden Spencer (2010–); Lucky and Elizabeth's son
 Lulu Spencer (1988–); Laura and Luke's daughter; married Dante Falconeri (2011–16, 2016–)
 Rocco Falconeri (2013–); Lulu and Dante's son
 Charlotte Cassadine (2009–); Lulu's daughter with Valentin Cassadine
 Mike Webber; Rick and Lesley's adopted son
 Rick Webber, Jr. (1985–); Rick and Ginny's son

References

Fictional families
General Hospital families
General Hospital characters